Pivac, Pivač, Пивач is a surname. Notable people with the surname include:

 Lazo Pivač (born 1967), Serbian rower
 Wayne Pivac (born 1962), New Zealand rugby coach, coach of the Wales team